Pick n Pay may refer to:

 Pick-N-Pay Supermarkets, a chain of groceries that operated in Ohio
 Pick n Pay Stores, a grocery store chain in South Africa
 Pick n Pay Hypermarket, supermarkets in Australia